Madhura Raja is a 2019 Indian Malayalam-language action comedy film directed by Vysakh, written by Udaykrishna and starring Mammootty, Jagapathi Babu and Jai alongside Anusree, Siddique, Nedumudi Venu, Vijayaraghavan, Salim Kumar, Mahima Nambiar, Anna Rajan and Shamna Kasim in supporting roles. The music is composed by Gopi Sundar. This film marks the debut of Jai in Malayalam cinema. The film is a spin-off to 2010 film Pokkiri Raja and Mammootty reprises his role as Raja.

The film received mixed to positive reviews from critics and audiences . Madhura Raja was released worldwide on 12 April 2019 two days before the Vishu holiday.

Plot
 
S.I. Balachandran is an honest police officer who heads to Pambinthurthu to confront and arrest V.R. Nadesan, an illegal liquor brewer. He fails to do so after a fellow policeman betrays him, and there, he is mauled to death by Nadeshan's hounds. 25 years later, Madhavan Nair and Krishnan Mamma visit Pambinthurthu based on the complaints put forward by the school staff on the island. Nadesan tries to oppose them. Chinna is sent to help Madhavan, but the situation goes out of hand when Chinnan gets arrested. Hearing this, Raja arrives and frees Chinnan. He sets to eliminate Nadesan. Later, he enters as the opposition candidate to Nadesan in an upcoming election rest of the story forms the story When to Nadeshan Killed Paulow's daughter lissy death and finally Chinnan death And Meenakshi escaped When Raja's truth for Chinnan's death. Chinnan's dead body made Raja very emotional for Chinnan's death and finally, Raja started the fight with Nadesan and Raja killed Nadesan for murdering S.I. Balachandran, Chinnan and Lissy. Nadeshan's illegal liquor blasted after 3 months later, Sugunan and Manoharan Mangalodayam Visits meeting in trivandrum Manoharan for new novel new novel name is Minister Raja.

Cast

 Mammootty as Kunnath Raja / Madhura Raja 
Jagapathi Babu as V.R. Nadesan 
 Jai as Chinnan
Anusree as Vasanthi 
 Siddique as Commissioner Rajendra Babu
 Nedumudi Venu as Kunnath Madhavan Nair
 Vijayaraghavan as Kunnath Krishnan
 Salim Kumar as Manoharan Mangalodayam
 Charan Raj as Maniyannan
 Mahima Nambiar as Meenakshi, Vasanthi's Sister, Chinnan's lover
 Shamna Kasim as Amala, Krishnan's Daughter
 Anna Rajan as Lissy, Poulo's daughter
 Vinaya Prasad as Lillykutty Teacher, Krishnan's Wife
 Thesni Khan as Ramani, Manoharan's wife
 Santhosh Keezhattoor as Poulo Varghese, police constable Lissy's father 
 Aju Varghese as Suru
 Noby Marcose as Pothan
 Bijukuttan as Vasu
 Ramesh Pisharody as Achu, Raja's Cameraman
 Kalabhavan Shajohn as Peruchazhi Perumal
 Balachandran Chullikkadu as Mohandas, Raja's Lawyer
 M. R. Gopakumar as Gopalan
 Kailash as Rasool, Lissy's and Amala's friend
 G. Suresh Kumar as Minister Koshy
 R. K. Suresh as CI David
 Jayan Cherthala as Constable Chandran, Nadeshan's Left hand
 Baiju V. K. as SI Raveendran
 Baiju Ezhupunna as Chandru
 Chali Pala as Udumbu Vikraman
 Kozhikode Narayanan Nair as NCC Member
 Narain as SI Balachandran (Cameo appearance)
 Suraj Venjaramoodu as CI Idivettu Sugunan (Cameo appearance)
 Parvathy Nambiar as Daisy, Balachandran's wife (Cameo appearance)
 Sunny Leone as herself (Cameo appearance in item song "Moha Mundiri")

Production
Madhura Raja was produced by Nelson Ipe under the banner Nelson Ipe Cinemas, made on a budget of 27 crore. The principal production commenced in Cochin in August 2018. Mammootty reprises the role Raja he played in the 2010 film Pokkiri Raja. Tamil actor Jai also plays an important character, and Madhura Raja marks his debut in Malayalam cinema. Vysakh retained Shaji Kumar and John Kutty, who did cinematography and editing after cinema Odiyan. The action choreographer of the film was Peter Hein, who had worked previously with Vysakh in Pulimurugan (2016). Filming was completed in three schedules with the second schedule being wrapped up in December 2018.

Release

Theatrical 
The film got released in theatres on 12 April 2019. In the USA, the film secured the second biggest release for a Malayalam film with 58 locations. At USA, UAE and UK box office, the film got released in 216 locations.

Reception

Box office

The film collected ₹9.5 crores in opening day in Worldwide box office. The opening day in UAE gross of ₹3.03 cr is Mammootty's career-best in the region. In Tamil Nadu, the film has garnered close to ₹36 lakhs gross in three days, which is again the best opening for Mammootty. The film's three-day total from Bengaluru stands at a whopping ₹48.27 lakhs, making it the third highest grosser in the city that year.

In 17 days, it grossed $1.822 million (₹12.72 crore) from overseas territories (of which $1.655 million (₹11.5 crore) was from UAE-GCC region alone). As of 21 June, Madhura Raja is the fifth best Malayalam grosser of 2019 outside Kerala.

In the opening weekend, it grossed $772,092 in the UAE (best grosser of that weekend), $32,989 (₹22.88 lakh) in the US, $9,900 (₹6.87 lakh) in Canada, £8,007 (₹7.27 lakh) in the UK, A$10,869 (₹5.41 lakh) in Australia, and NZ$3,708 (₹1.73 lakh) in New Zealand. And grossed $1,024,670 in the UAE and A$19,855 (₹9.79 lakh) in Australia in three weeks, $13,392 (₹9.3 lakh) in Canada in four weeks, and £34,334 (₹31.32 lakh) in the UK in five weeks.

 
The film's Telugu version Raja Narasimha ran for 75 days in Andhra Pradesh box office.

The film's final collection grossed over ₹125 crore from worldwide box office in its final run. The film ran 150 days in theatres.

Critical response
Sify rated the film 3 out of 5 stars and called it as a Masala Entertainer and wrote: "Madhura Raja is no less than a treat for the fans of Mammootty. It’s a fun ride that can be watched with a tub of popcorn. Go for it!".

Future
The first film released of the Raja Series was Pokkiri Raja in 2010. The next sequel of the series is Madhura Raja in 2019. The third one of the series has been announced and titled Minister Raja.

Music

The film's music is composed by Gopi Sundar. The soundtrack was launched on 14 February 2019.

References

External links
 

2010s Malayalam-language films
Indian action films
Indian sequel films
Films shot in Kochi
Films shot in Alappuzha
Films scored by Gopi Sundar
2019 masala films
Films directed by Vysakh
2019 action films